Ole Johansen (17 December 1904 - 31 December 1986) was a Norwegian politician for the Liberal Party.

He served as a deputy representative to the Norwegian Parliament from Sør-Trøndelag during the term 1965–1969.

External links

1904 births
1986 deaths
Liberal Party (Norway) politicians
Deputy members of the Storting